Jach'a Qullu (Aymara jach'a big, qullu mountain, "big mountain", also spelled Jachcha Khollu) is a  mountain in the Bolivian Andes which reaches a height of approximately . It is located in the La Paz Department, Loayza Province, Luribay Municipality.

References 

Mountains of La Paz Department (Bolivia)